This is a list of rugby teams in Hungary, as per the 2011/2012 season.

Extraliga
Battai Bulldogok RK 
Budapest Exiles RFC
Esztergomi Vitézek Rugby SE
Fit World Gorillák RC
Kecskeméti Atlétika és Rugby Club

Nemzeti Bajnokság I
Békéscsabai Benny Bulls RC
Elefántok Rögbi SE
Pécsi Indiánok SK
Szentesi VSC 91-esek Rögbi Szakosztály
Velencei Kék Cápák RK

Nemzeti Bajnokság II
Ceglédi RC
Gödöllői Ördögök RC
Gyöngyösi Farkasok RK
SZTE EHÖK SE

Non-league
Fehérvár RC
Gyulai Várvédők RK
Medvék RK
Völgy Lovagjai Rögbi SE

Rugby clubs
Hungary